The 1927 Quebec general election was held on May 16, 1927, to elect members of the Legislative Assembly of the Province of Quebec, Canada. The incumbent Quebec Liberal Party, led by Louis-Alexandre Taschereau, was re-elected, defeating the Quebec Conservative Party, led by Arthur Sauvé.

It was the second general election victory in a row for Louis-Alexandre Taschereau, who had held office since 1920.

Results
Twelve Liberal MLAs were returned by acclamation, including one on the Island of Montreal. Taschereau himself was acclaimed in Montmorency, because of the alleged technical rejection of the Conservative candidate Lucien Drolet's nomination papers. Drolet would later sue the returning officer over this.

The Liberals won back six of the Montreal seats they had lost in 1923. There was a controversy in Montréal–Saint-Louis, where the Conservative candidate Louis Fitch claimed that he had been subject to false arrest on Election Day.

Polling was deferred to May 23 in Gaspé. This was because weather conditions caused the closure of many roads in the area.

|-
! colspan=2 rowspan=2 | Political party
! rowspan=2 | Party leader
! colspan=4 | MPPs
! colspan=4 | Votes
|-
! Candidates
!1923
!1927
!±
!#
! ±
!%
! ± (pp)
|-
|rowspan="3" |  
|style="text-align:left;" colspan="10"|Government candidates
|-
|style="text-align:left;" |
|style="text-align:left;"|Louis-Alexandre Taschereau
|85
|64
|74
|10
|188,687
|38,957
|59.34
|7.82
|-
|style="text-align:left;" |
|style="text-align:left;"|–
|3
|–
|–
|–
|1,365
|
|0.43
|
|-
|rowspan="5" |  
|style="text-align:left;" colspan="10"|Opposition candidates
|-
|style="text-align:left;" |
|style="text-align:left;"|Arthur Sauvé
|67
|20
|9
|11
|109,105
|92,295
|34.31
|5.01
|-
|style="text-align:left;" |
|style="text-align:left;"|–
|–
|1
|–
|1
| style="text-align:center;" colspan="4"|Did not campaign
|-
|style="text-align:left;" |
|style="text-align:left;"|–
|3
|–
|–
|–
|2,685
|2,246
|0.84
|0.86
|-
|style="text-align:left;" |
|style="text-align:left;"|–
|1
|–
|1
|1
|4,432
|1,993
|1.39
|0.55
|-
|rowspan="3" |  
|style="text-align:left;" colspan="10"|Other candidates
|-
|style="text-align:left;" |
|style="text-align:left;"|–
|7
|–
|1
|1
|9,345
|3,759
|2.94
|1.02
|-
|style="text-align:left;" |
|style="text-align:left;"|–
|1
|–
|–
|–
|2,342
|1,417
|0.74
|0.42
|-
! colspan="3" style="text-align:left;" | Total
| 167
! " colspan="3"| 85
! " colspan="2"| 317,961
! " colspan="2"| 100%
|-
| colspan="7" style="text-align:left;" | Rejected ballots
| 2,843
| 965
| colspan="2"|
|-
| colspan="7" style="text-align:left;" | Voter turnout
| 320,804
| 26,347
| 62.91
| 0.89
|-
| colspan="7" style="text-align:left;" | Registered electors (contested ridings only)
| 509,935
| 35,141
| colspan="2"|
|-
| colspan="5" style="text-align:left;" | Candidates returned by acclamation
| 12
| 4
| colspan="4"|
|}

See also
 List of Quebec premiers
 Politics of Quebec
 Timeline of Quebec history
 List of Quebec political parties
 17th Legislative Assembly of Quebec

Further reading

References

Quebec general election
Elections in Quebec
General election
Quebec general election